Pyotr Avilov (10 June 1910 – 2004) was a Soviet sports shooter. He competed in two events at the 1952 Summer Olympics., 50 m rifle prone and 50 m rifle three positions.

References

1910 births
2004 deaths
Soviet male sport shooters
Olympic shooters of the Soviet Union
Shooters at the 1952 Summer Olympics
People from Belgorod
Sportspeople from Belgorod Oblast